Permanent Secretaries are the chief executive officers of government ministries in Barbados and are responsible to the Head of the Public Service, who is Chairman of the Committee of Permanent Secretaries and Officers of Related Grade established by the Public Service Act, and to the Parliament of Barbados.

List of Government Ministries, Ministers and Permanent Secretaries

Members of the Committee of Permanent Secretaries and Officers of Related Grade 

Government of Barbados